St John Ambulance Australia (N.S.W.) (St John NSW) is a charitable organisation dedicated to helping people in sickness, distress, suffering or danger. It provides first aid training and event and community health care services. It is part of an international organisation that consists of eight Priories that form the Order of St John. The organisation is sometimes incorrectly referred to "St John's Ambulance" or "St Johns Ambulance" instead of "St John Ambulance".

History of St John Ambulance 

In the 19th century, a group of citizens revived the Order of St John in England, drawing their inspiration from the example of the Knights of St John, who, in medieval times, offered care and shelter for pilgrims and crusaders.

St John Ambulance was established in 1877 to put its humanitarian ideals into practice in the new industrial society, promoting the cause of first aid for the sick and wounded through volunteer effort. St John Ambulance Australia was established in 1883, with associations set up in each state and territory.

Activity streams 
St John NSW has several areas of focus:

Event health services 
First Aiders, First Responders, Advanced Responders and Health Care Professionals provide comprehensive medical services at events ranging from small community events (such as school fates and sports days, corporate events), to large public events such as ANZAC day services, Sydney Royal Easter Show, City2Surf, Music Festivals, and New Year's Eve celebrations.

Previously known as First Aid Services (FAS), and Operations Branch (OB).

Training 
St John Ambulance is one of the largest first aid training organisations in Australia. St John NSW delivers nationally recognised training through the Australian Qualifications Framework, through the registration of their parent organisation St John Ambulance Australia.

Public 
St John NSW can provide training to the public for units of competency including:

 Provide cardiopulmonary resuscitation
 Provide basic emergency life support
 Provide first aid (previously known as Apply First Aid and Senior First Aid) 
 Provide an emergency first aid response in an education and care setting
 Provide first aid in remote situations
 Provide advanced first aid
 Provide advanced resuscitation
 Manage first aid services and resources
 Provide pain management
 Perform rescue from a live low-voltage (LV) panel

Revenue derived from training is reinvested into training volunteers and community programs to promote the cause of saving lives through first aid awareness.

Internal 
St John NSW members undergo internal training programs to obtain clinical qualifications and positions within the organisation.

 St John First Aiders hold:
 Provide first aid 
 St John First Responders hold:
 Requirements of St John First Aider
 Provide advanced first aid 
 Provide advanced resuscitation
 Provide pain management
 Certificate II in Medical Service First Response
 St John Advanced Responders hold:
 Requirements of St John First Responder
 Certificate III in Basic Health Care
 Senior officers hold:
 Certificate IV in Leadership and Management
 Trainers hold:
 Certificate IV in Training and Assessment

Members must undergo yearly reaccreditation and minimum hours to hold clinical ranks. Other positions also require ongoing professional development to demonstrate currency.

St John NSW does not train paramedics or offer diplomas in paramedical science programs in NSW.

Education and awareness 
As advocates for first aid, St John NSW volunteer trainers deliver first aid skills in the community.

St John NSW supports and funds a "First Aid in Schools" program aimed and engaging primary school aged students in first aid. St John continues to use its influence to promote early education in schools across Australia.

Examples of the program success is becoming more visible in the media:

 Nikita Stutchbury saves mother, October 2015
 Zach Redwood saves five-year-old brother, March 2016
 Preston May saves little brother, March 2016

Recognition programs are in place to award the public for use of first aid and CPR skills in the community. "Save a Life Award was an important opportunity to publicly acknowledge the admirable actions of recipients, and thank them on behalf of patients, their families and the local community."

St John produce and distribute publications aimed at educating the general public including posters and fact sheets. The "St John Australian First Aid Manual" is widely distributed and is edited by a clinical board yearly to align with the most current evidence available.

St John Ambulance Australia has created and operates an Automated External Defibrillators (AED) register. The register aims to help locate this essential equipment often required in cardiac arrest.

Equipment 
St John NSW offers several services including:

 First aid kit manufacture and sales (direct or through local retailers)
 First aid stock manufactured and distribution
 Automatic External Defibrillator (AED) sales including equip, install and compliance check 
 Kit audit and restock services for state Work Health and Safety Act compliance.

First aid equipment is also utilised within the Event Health Services branch.

Ophthalmic Care 

St John NSW raises funds and recruits staff for "ophthalmic projects in rural and remote areas of Northern NSW" the St John Ophthalmic Eye Hospital in Jerusalem.

Emergency response
St John NSW is a "participating organisation under the NSW HEALTHPLAN and maintains a formal resource commitment agreement with NSW Health" to assist in disaster relief activities.

In practice, recently this has involved St John volunteers:

 Providing first aid and support at evacuation centres for bushfires and floods.
 Providing first aid at staging areas for other emergency services (e.g. NSW Rural Fire Service) at bushfires.
 Volunteer support to public information hotlines.
 Assistance with temperature screening and testing services during the COVID-19 pandemic.

St John Ambulance volunteers also provide the emergency ambulance service for Norfolk Island.

Divisions 
St John Ambulance has 72 divisions across New South Wales from 18 areas. Combined divisions include both adult members as well as cadet and junior members. Cadet divisions are only for cadets and junior members, and all other divisions are for adults over 18 years old only.

Ranks

Vehicles

Vehicles are used within St John NSW to support the organisational needs and values.

Event Health Services
All the event health services vehicles are fitted with flashing red or red and white beacons, sirens, highly visible vehicle livery as well as radio communications.

Strict internal policies applies to the use of lights and sirens.

Casualty management vehicles 
An ambulance or patient transport vehicle that is either two or four-wheel drive. This type of vehicle is fitted with a Stryker stretcher, piped oxygen, and other pre-hospital care equipment.

Communications vehicles 
Vehicles used by the state communications group to provide radio communications for events.

Bicycle emergency response vehicles 
Vehicles used by the bicycle emergency response team to transport bicycles and other equipment to and from events.

Command vehicles 
Vehicles driven by members of command staff for duties to and from the event.

Business stream
Stub to expand
Vehicles may be used for specialist business areas, such as the equipment supply and restocking business stream. Vehicle livery is intended to match the vehicle purpose, and may possess either corporate or service specific branding.

Role specific
Stub to expand
Where the Board and/or the CEO has determine that a vehicle is required for effective performance in the job role, that role may access or be assigned a fleet vehicle. Vehicles are either plain in appearance, or branded with corporate livery.

See also 

 St John Ambulance
 St John Ambulance Australia
 Ministry of Health (New South Wales)
 New South Wales Ambulance

References

External links 
 St John NSW Website
 St John Ambulance Australia Website

1903 establishments in Australia
Ambulance services in Australia
Health charities in Australia
Emergency medical services in Australia
Medical and health organisations based in New South Wales
St John Ambulance